The 2017 Open Féminin de Marseille was a professional tennis tournament played on outdoor clay courts. It was the twentieth edition of the tournament and part of the 2017 ITF Women's Circuit, offering a total of $100,000 in prize money. It took place in Marseille, France, from 5–11 June 2017.

Point distribution

Singles main draw entrants

Seeds 

 1 Rankings as of 29 May 2017

Other entrants 
The following players received wildcards into the singles main draw:
  Audrey Albié
  Sara Cakarevic
  Caroline Roméo
  Margot Yerolymos

The following players received entry into the singles main draw by a protected ranking:
  Anhelina Kalinina

The following players received entry from the qualifying draw:
  Alexandra Dulgheru
  Ekaterine Gorgodze
  Priscilla Heise
  Jessica Moore

Champions

Singles

 Jasmine Paolini def.  Tatjana Maria, 6–4, 2–6, 6–1

Doubles

 Natela Dzalamidze /  Veronika Kudermetova def.  Dalma Gálfi /  Dalila Jakupović, 7–6(7–5), 6–4

External links 
 2017 Open Féminin de Marseille at ITFtennis.com
 Official website

2017 in French tennis
2017 ITF Women's Circuit
2017